The General Douglas MacArthur Causeway is a six-lane causeway that connects Downtown Miami to South Beach via Biscayne Bay in Miami-Dade County.

The highway is the singular roadway connecting the mainland and beaches to Watson Island and the bay neighborhoods of Palm Island, Hibiscus Island, and Star Island. The MacArthur Causeway carries State Road 836 and State Road A1A over the Biscayne Bay via a girder bridge. Interstate 395 ends at Fountain Street, the entrance to Palm Island Park which has a traffic light as well as bus stops.

History
In the late 1910s, with the deteriorating wooden Collins Bridge (now, the Venetian Causeway) as the only direct land route between mainland Miami and the barrier islands of Miami Beach, construction on the roadway began in 1917. The roadway, dedicated as the County Causeway, was completed in 1920. Watson Island was reclaimed surrounding the western end of the roadway, completed in 1926.

Having undergone several lane and structural expansions following opening of the original two-lane road, the State Road Board and Dade County Commission voted to rename the causeway in honor of World War II General Douglas MacArthur in 1942.  The causeway was accessible from mainland Miami via Biscayne Boulevard and intersecting side streets through the 1960s. Construction of direct highway access to I-395  was complete in the 1970s. The replacement of the westernmost and easternmost spans began in the 1990s, as the eastbound lanes of the bridges were completed in 1995 and westbound lanes finished in 1997.

Gallery

References

External links 

 , 2006

Roads in Miami
Roads in Miami Beach, Florida
Roads in Miami-Dade County, Florida
Causeways in Miami-Dade County, Florida
Bridges completed in 1920
Intracoastal Waterway
1920 establishments in Florida
U.S. Route 41
Concrete bridges in the United States
Girder bridges in the United States
Road bridges in Florida
Beam bridges in the United States
Bridges of the United States Numbered Highway System